David Moura Pereira da Silva (born 24 August 1987) is a Brazilian judoka. He won a silver medal at the 2017 World Judo Championships in Budapest. In 2020, he won one of the bronze medals in the men's +100 kg event at the 2020 Pan American Judo Championships held in Guadalajara, Mexico. In 2021, he competed in the men's +100 kg event at the 2021 Judo World Masters held in Doha, Qatar.

He is the nephew of fellow judo champion Luiz Virgilio Castro de Moura.

References

External links

 

1987 births
Living people
Brazilian male judoka
Pan American Games medalists in judo
Pan American Games gold medalists for Brazil
Judoka at the 2015 Pan American Games
Judoka at the 2019 Pan American Games
Universiade bronze medalists for Brazil
Universiade medalists in judo
People from Cuiabá
Medalists at the 2011 Summer Universiade
Medalists at the 2015 Pan American Games
Medalists at the 2019 Pan American Games
Sportspeople from Mato Grosso
20th-century Brazilian people
21st-century Brazilian people